Coleg Sir Gâr is a further education college in Carmarthenshire, Wales, with five campuses across the county.

The college
Coleg Sir Gâr is a large, multi-site, further education college. It is part of the University of Wales Trinity Saint David Group. The college is based in South West Wales and has five main campuses. They vary in size and nature and offer a variety of subjects. The college offers further education, adult and community learning, higher education and work-based learning. There are about 10,000 students in all, of whom some 3,000 are full-time and 7,000 are part-time. There are over 900 higher education students.

The college has a broad range of academic and vocational education and training programmes, including tailor-made training for employers. Courses range from pre-entry to postgraduate level. It also offers its provision on-line, via partnerships at community locations and in the workplace. Work-based training programmes such as foundation and modern apprenticeships are also offered. The college also provides for around 1000 school pupils aged 14–19 who attend the college or are taught by college staff at their schools.

A new principal was appointed on 31 August 2018, following the retirement of Barry Liles.

The college has an annual turnover of around £30m and employs about 850 staff. Roughly 450 of these are directly involved in teaching and 400 perform support and administrative functions.

The college has recently merged with Coleg Ceredigion.

Campuses
Coleg Sir Gâr
Graig, Sandy Road, Pwll, Llanelli
Pibwrlwyd, Carmarthen
Ammanford
Gelli Aur, Llandeilo
Jobs Well, Jobs Well Road, Carmarthen

Coleg Ceredigion
Aberystwyth Campus 
Cardigan Campus

History
The name of the college is Welsh for Carmarthenshire College.

Coleg Sir Gâr has been providing further education since 1985. It was first created as Carmarthenshire College of Technology and Art (CCTA) by merging several technical colleges and the Dyfed College of Art. In 1992, the college became an independent corporation, having previously been under the control of the local education authority. Since 1 August 2013, the college has been part of the University of Wales Trinity Saint David Group.

The Graig Campus, Llanelli, was formerly occupied by Graig Comprehensive School and Llanelli Boys' Grammar School. As CCTA, the Llanelli campus was based at Alban Road in Llanelli. This was the site of former Llanelli Technical College.

Carmarthen School of Art originated in 1854. It combined with the Llanelli college in 1971 to become Dyfed College of Art. In 1979 the new campus at Jobs Well Road, Carmarthen was built.

Virtual college
The virtualcollege.ac.uk was created in 1998 by Coleg Sir Gâr to meet the growing demands of industry in Carmarthenshire. The training courses developed were delivered completely online in the area of IT skills. Since then the virtual college has expanded to include almost 1000 courses in a number of areas, amongst them teacher training, accountancy, business, leadership and management, health and safety and languages. All the accredited courses are delivered completely online supported by tutors from the college.

Notable former pupils 
 Josh Adams, rugby union player
 David Gray, singer and songwriter
 Terry Price, rugby union player
 Kenneth Bowen, tenor at the Royal Academy of Music

References

External links

 Coleg Sir Gâr (Official Site)
 Twitter
 Virtual College 
 University of Wales : Trinity St David
 Moodle4Teachers

Further education colleges in Carmarthenshire